The New People's Party of Slovenia (Slovene: Nova ljudska stranka Slovenije, NLS) is a political party in Slovenia. The party, which evolved from the so-called "Mayor's list" (Slovene: Županova lista), was founded on 12 May 2016 by former Maribor mayor, Franc Kangler.

In February 2018, it was revealed that NLS would be joining forces with the party Voice for Children and Families to form United Right, an electoral alliance, to jointly contest the upcoming 2018 Slovenian parliamentary election.

The party, along with Voice for Children and Families, is said to function as a "satellite" of the largest conservative party in Slovenia, the Slovenian Democratic Party, since it could enable it to form a coalition of loyal, seemingly independent parties.

Electoral results

National Assembly

References

2016 establishments in Slovenia
Agrarian parties in Slovenia
Conservative parties in Slovenia
Political parties established in 2016